The 1886 Oregon gubernatorial election took place on June 7, 1886 to elect the governor of the U.S. state of Oregon. The election matched Republican former state senator Thomas R. Cornelius against Democrat Sylvester Pennoyer.

Pennoyer gained support for advocating the use of American labor over Chinese immigrants.

Results

References

Gubernatorial
1886
Oregon